Gornje Novo Selo is a village in the municipality of Bujanovac, Serbia. According to the 2002 census, the town had a population of 437. Of these, 436 (99,77 %) were ethnic Albanians, and 1 (0,22 %) other.

References

Populated places in Pčinja District
Albanian communities in Serbia